Uganda competed at the 2014 Summer Youth Olympics, in Nanjing, China from 16 August to 28 August 2014.

Medalists

Athletics

Uganda qualified three athletes.

Qualification Legend: Q=Final A (medal); qB=Final B (non-medal); qC=Final C (non-medal); qD=Final D (non-medal); qE=Final E (non-medal)

Boys
Track & road events

Girls
Track & road events

Badminton

Uganda was given a quota to compete by the tripartite committee.

Singles

Doubles

Rowing

Uganda was given a boat to compete by the tripartite committee.

Qualification Legend: FA=Final A (medal); FB=Final B (non-medal); FC=Final C (non-medal); FD=Final D (non-medal); SA/B=Semifinals A/B; SC/D=Semifinals C/D; R=Repechage

Table Tennis

Uganda was given a quota to compete by the tripartite committee.

Singles

Team

Qualification Legend: Q=Main Bracket (medal); qB=Consolation Bracket (non-medal)

References

2014 in Ugandan sport
Nations at the 2014 Summer Youth Olympics
Uganda at the Youth Olympics